Gordine is a surname. Notable people with the surname include:

Barry Gordine (born 1948), English footballer
Dora Gordine (1895–1991), Estonian sculptor